Detters Mill was a small 19th-century community in Dover Township, York County, Pennsylvania, about  south of Wellsville, and  southwest of Harrisburg.

In 1830, a local miller named George Sheffer constructed a stone grist mill on Harmony Grove Road near the confluence of Bermudian Creek and Conewago Creek. A few other families later constructed homes in the vicinity. The mill, located on the western bank of Conewago Creek, closed in the early 20th century and the community waned. The covered bridge of the township collapsed in 1965. As of 2008, the old mill is being used as an apartment complex.

References
Prowell, George R., A History of York County, Pennsylvania. 1907.

Unincorporated communities in York County, Pennsylvania
Unincorporated communities in Pennsylvania
1830 establishments in Pennsylvania